Big Marsh, Nova Scotia could be the following places in Nova Scotia:
 Big Marsh in Antigonish County
 Big Marsh in Inverness County